The Berliner Verkehrsblätter with the subtitle Informationsschrift des Arbeitskreises Berliner Nahverkehr e.V. has been published since 1954.

History
Berliner Verkehrsblätter was founded in 1954 by Siegfried Münzinger and Wolfgang Kramer. It was published in 1954 and 1955 under the name Der Berliner Verkehrsamateur. The aim of the journal was to record and document the modernisation in the transport sector that began with the reconstruction with new technology and new vehicles in a traffic chronicle to be updated. The information brochure has been published monthly since the beginning and began with a free, three-page and hectographed edition of 30 copies. At the beginning of the 1970s, the volume was 20 pages and the print run was over 500 copies, still written on a hand-held matrix and duplicated by hand. Since January 1972, the Verkehrsblätter have been produced in offset printing and are now also available online. Today (as of 2018), the magazine has 20 to 24 pages in DIN A4 format and is distributed by subscription or through specialist shops.

Topics
According to the Berliner Verkehrsblätter [...], the reports cover current and historical topics: Line chronicle, fleet, tariffs, museum vehicles, technology, reviews and current short news from the areas of S-Bahn, U-Bahn, railway, tram, bus and passenger shipping. Photos and illustrations supplement the reports. The topics of issue 1/2012 include, for example: Berlin steam tram 1886-1898 and milestones at the main and cemetery railway. A series of publications supplements the publications of the Berliner Verkehrsblätter. The books include a tram line chronicle from 1945 to 1993, a chronicle of the Berlin subway and a compendium of Berlin S-Bahn stations.

In addition to its publishing activities, the Berliner Verkehrsblätter participate in exhibitions, special trips and information events.

References

External links
 

1954 establishments in West Germany
Magazines published in Berlin
Magazines established in 1954
German-language magazines
Transport magazines
Business magazines published in Germany
Monthly magazines published in Germany
Free magazines